The list of ship launches in 1899 includes a chronological list of some ships launched in 1899.


References 

Sources

1899
 
Shi